Wendell Avery Tyler (born May 20, 1955) is an American former professional football player who was a running back in the National Football League (NFL). He was selected by the Los Angeles Rams in the 3rd round of the 1977 NFL Draft. A 5'10", 198 lbs. running back from UCLA, Tyler played in 10 NFL seasons from 1977 to 1986 for the Los Angeles Rams and San Francisco 49ers.

In 1979, he helped lead the Rams to Super Bowl XIV, where they were defeated 31-19 by the Pittsburgh Steelers. In 1984, he rushed for a 49er team record 1,262 yards during the regular season, and also caught 28 passes for 230 yards,  was selected to the Pro Bowl, and played in Super Bowl XIX in which the 49ers defeated the Miami Dolphins 38-16. Tyler was the first player ever to lead two teams in rushing in two Super Bowls.

College career
Tyler played running back at UCLA from 1973–1976 and is fifth in career rushing yards for the Bruins, with 3,240 yards. 1976 All-Conference and 3rd team All American,  Tyler was on the 1975 UCLA team that won the Pacific-8 Conference and defeated number one ranked Ohio State in the Rose Bowl. He was inducted into the UCLA Athletics Hall of Fame in 2016.

Personal life
Tyler's son, Marc Tyler was rated by ESPN as the top high school running back in the United States graduating in 2007. Marc played football at powerhouse Oaks Christian High School in Westlake Village, California and played college football for the USC Trojans, the chief rival of his father's alma mater, UCLA.

References

1955 births
Living people
Players of American football from Shreveport, Louisiana
American football running backs
UCLA Bruins football players
Los Angeles Rams players
San Francisco 49ers players
National Conference Pro Bowl players